Bishungarh may refer to:
Bishungarh, Uttar Pradesh, a village
Bishnugarh (community development block), also called Bishungarh, in Jharkhand